Elupanatham or Ilupanatham is a village Gram panchayat in Salem district, Thalaivasal block in the Indian state of Tamil Nadu.

Ellupanatham is about eight kilometres south of Thalaivasal towards Veeraganur.

History
Ellupanatham was part of the Magadai Mandalam as of 1190 AD. Probably, during the Palaiyakkarar rule. The village is probably named due to presence of large number of Illupai Madhuca longifolia tree.

Borders 
Kamakkapalayam, Puliyankurichi, Vellaiyur, Veeraganur, Naavazlur, & Veppampuundi.

Education 
 Govt Middle School
 Ramakrishna Matriculation School

Transport
 Ellupanathem bus route is linked to Attur, Kallakurichi, Veeraganur, Thalaivasal, and Perambalur
 The nearest railway stations are located at Attur, Chinna Salem.
 The nearest airport is Trichy Airport (India), about 85 km away
 Thammampatti to Chennai bus available at (9:30 PM at Elupanatham Bus stop Daily).
 6 hours travel to Chennai, Coimbatore, Bangalore

Temples 
Maduraiveeran temple
Kaliamman temple
Mariamman temple
Murugan temple, Puththu Mariamman temple, Iyappan Swamy temple

References

Villages in Salem district